Here Comes Trouble is the 10th studio album by the English hard rock band Bad Company, it would be the last studio album with Brian Howe as lead vocalist. The album was released in September 1992. The cover is an image by Mark Vincent of his young brother in front of a chopper. The title track received some airplay on classic rock radio, although "How About That" was the biggest single from the album, spending six weeks at the top of the Album Rock Tracks chart in the US.

Track listing
All songs written by Brian Howe and Terry Thomas, except where noted.

Personnel
Bad Company
 Brian Howe – vocals, saxophone
 Mick Ralphs – guitar, keyboards
 Felix Krish – bass
 Simon Kirke – drums, vocals (track 11)
Additional musicians 
 Dave "Bucket" Colwell – guitar
 Terry Thomas – guitar, keyboards, Hammond organ, backing vocals
 Richard Cottle – keyboards on track 11
 Birdinia Armbruster, Richa Sands, Snovia Pierre – chorus

References

External links
 https://www.discogs.com/Bad-Company-Here-Comes-Trouble/release/1865852

Bad Company albums
1992 albums
Atco Records albums